Jorge Hugo Canavesi (22 August 1920 – 2 December 2016) was an Argentine basketball player and coach. He was inducted into the FIBA Hall of Fame, as a coach, in 2016.

Playing career
Canavesi began playing club basketball in Argentina, with the youth teams of Parque Chacabuco, in 1937. In 1941, he began playing club basketball in Argentina, at the senior men's level, with Club Gymnasia y Esgrima de Villa del Parque. With that club, he won the Argentine Federation League championship, as a player-coach, in 1945.

Coaching career

Club coaching career
At the senior men's club level, Canavesi first worked as a player-coach of the Argentine Club Gymnasia y Esgrima de Villa del Parque. With them, he won an Argentine Federation League championship in 1945. As a head coach, he also won the Argentine Federation League championship with Club Capital Federal, in 1953, and with Club Catamarca, in 1970.

National team coaching career
Canavesi was the head coach of the senior men's Argentine national basketball team. He was Argentina's head coach at the 1948 Summer Olympics. He then led Argentina to the gold medal at the 1950 FIBA World Championship, which was the first ever edition of the FIBA World Cup.

He also led Argentina to the silver medal at the 1951 Pan American games, and also coached Argentina at the 1952 Summer Olympics. He was also Argentina's head coach at the 1971 Pan American Games, and led them to a bronze medal at the 1971 FIBA South American Championship.

Personal life
Canavesi died in Argentina, on 2 December 2016, at the age of 96.

References

External links 
FIBA Hall of Fame Profile
Entrevista a Jorge Canavesi. 

1920 births
2016 deaths
Argentine basketball coaches
Argentine men's basketball players
Argentine people of Italian descent
FIBA Hall of Fame inductees
Guards (basketball)
Basketball players from Buenos Aires